The Australian cricket team toured India in the 1986–87 season to play a three-match Test series and a five-match one day international series against India.

The Test series was drawn 0-0, with one tie, and India won the one-day series 3–2. It is best remembered for the tied first Test – only the second time this result has occurred in Test cricket.

Australian squad
Australia had just lost two-Test series against New Zealand and only narrowly held on to a 0–0 draw against India during the 1985–86 summer. The team was in a rebuilding phase, with Bob Simpson having newly been appointed as coach. However Australia were not unfamiliar with Indian conditions having recently toured in 1984.

The original squad was selected by Lawrie Sawle, Greg Chappell, Jim Higgs and Bobby Simpson. It was announced on 30 April 1986:
Batsmen – Allan Border (captain), David Boon (vice-captain), Geoff Marsh, Dean Jones, Greg Ritchie, Mike Veletta
Fastbowlers – Craig McDermott, Bruce Reid, Dave Gilbert, Simon Davis
Spinners – Ray Bright
All rounders – Greg Matthews, Steve Waugh
Wicketkeepers – Tim Zoehrer, Greg Dyer
Team officials – Bob Simpson (coach), Alan Crompton (tour manager), Errol Alcott (physio), Charlie Pinto (transport), Govind Bawji (baggageman)

A number of top-level Australian cricketers were unavailable for selection because they had signed to tour South Africa and were banned from playing international cricket.

Selection panel on tour: Border, Boon, Simpson

Wayne Phillips had been Australia's wicketkeeper over the 1985–86 summer, then replaced by Tim Zoehrer and tried as a batting specialist. However he was overlooked for selection – the only member of the New Zealand tour squad not picked to go to India. On the night of his non-selection Phillips told the media "I'm going to do what I want to do and not be at the beck and call of these idiots who pick the side." He was fined $2,000 by the Australian Cricket Board and never played cricket for Australia again.

Allan Border returned early from county cricket with Essex on 19 August to prepare for the tour. The Australian squad attended a special six day training camp with Simpson, Greg Chappell and Ashley Mallett.

Test series summary

First Test

See Tied Test for details.

Second Test

Third Test

ODI series

India won the Charminar Challenge Cup 3–2.

1st ODI

2nd ODI

3rd ODI

4th ODI

5th ODI

6th ODI

Tour matches
Board President's XI v Australians at Bangalore, 30 Aug-1 Sep 1986 – match drawn. Geoff Marsh scored a century and Matthews took five wickets in the game.
Bombay v Australians at Gwalior, 3-5 Sep 1986 – match drawn. Greg Ritchie scored a century as opener and Matthews made 99.
Indian Under-25 XI v Australians at Chandigarh, 12-14 Sep 1986 – match drawn
Delhi v Australians at Baroda, 10-12 Oct 1986 – match drawn – Dave Gilbert scored a century.

Summary
The tour established David Boon and Geoff Marsh as Australia's opening combination, and Dean Jones as a Test batsman. Greg Matthews appeared to establish his credentials as a top line spinner. Jones later argued the tied Test marked a turning point in Australian cricket, although Australia went on to lose the 1986–87 Ashes series 2–1. By the end of that series, Boon, Ritchie, Matthews, McDermott, Davis, Gilbert and Bright had all been dropped from the Australian Test team.

The experience gained by the players did prove valuable for Australia in their campaign to win the 1987 World Cup in India.

References

External links
 Tour home at ESPN Cricinfo
 Australia in India : Aug/Oct 1986 at ESPN Cricinfo archives
 Australian cricket team in 1986-87  at Test Cricket Tours

1986 in Australian cricket
1986 in Indian cricket
1986-87
Indian cricket seasons from 1970–71 to 1999–2000
International cricket competitions from 1985–86 to 1988